Password is an American television game show in which two teams, each composed of a celebrity player and a contestant, attempt to convey mystery words to each other using only single-word clues, in order to win cash prizes.

The show was created by Bob Stewart and originally produced by Mark Goodson-Bill Todman Productions. It aired on CBS from 1961 to 1967, and ABC from 1971 to 1975. The original host was Allen Ludden, who had previously been well known as the host of the G.E. College Bowl.

Two revivals later aired on NBC: Password Plus from 1979 to 1982, and Super Password from 1984 to 1989, followed by a primetime version, Million Dollar Password, on CBS from 2008 to 2009. All of these versions introduced new variations in gameplay.

The show was revived on NBC in 2022 with Keke Palmer as host and featuring Jimmy Fallon.

In 2013, TV Guide ranked it #8 in its list of the 60 greatest game shows ever.

Rules
Two teams, each consisting of one celebrity player and one "civilian" contestant, competed. The word to be conveyed (the "password") was given to one player on each team and was shown onscreen to viewers as well as spoken softly on the audio track. Gameplay alternated between the two teams. On each team, the player who was given the password gave a one-word clue from which their partner attempted to guess the password. If the partner failed to guess the password within the allotted five-second time limit, or if an illegal clue was given (two or more words, a hyphenated word, "coined" words, or any part or form of the password), play passed to the opposing team. If the password was revealed by the clue-giver it was thrown out.

The game continued until one of the players guessed the password correctly, any form of the password was given as a clue, or until ten clues had been given. Scoring was based on the number of clues given when the password was guessed, e.g. ten points were awarded for guessing the password on the first clue, nine points on the second clue, eight points on the third clue, etc., down to one point on the tenth and final clue. On the ABC version, a limit of six clues was imposed to expedite gameplay, with the last clue worth five points. In addition, teams were given the option of either playing or passing control of the first clue to the opposing team. Specifically, the team that was trailing in score, or that had lost the previous game, was offered the pass/play option; when the score was tied, the team that failed to get the previous password was awarded the pass/play option.

On the CBS daytime edition, the first team to reach 25 points won that contestant $100. On the nighttime edition, the winner won $250. The winning team earned a chance to win up to an additional $250 by playing the "Lightning Round", in which the civilian contestant on the prevailing team tried to guess five passwords within 60 seconds from clues given by his/her celebrity partner. $50 was awarded for each correctly guessed password (increased to $100 from 1973 to 1974).

The Lightning Round was among the first bonus rounds on a television game (along with the scrambled phrase game on the original Beat the Clock). On the ABC version from 1971 to 1974, immediately after completing the Lightning Round, the player was given a chance at "the Betting Word," in which they could wager any amount of their winnings on their celebrity partner's ability to guess it within 15 seconds. This increased the maximum bonus prize to $500 ($1,000 from 1973 to 1974 when the regular Lightning Round values were doubled).

In each episode from 1961 to 1975, Ludden would caution the players about unacceptable clues by stating, "When you hear this sound (a buzzer would sound) it means your clue has not been accepted by our authority, (name of word authority)." Word authorities on the CBS version included New York University professor David H. Greene and World Book Encyclopedia Dictionary editor Dr. Reason A. Goodwin (that dictionary being still a work-in-progress at the time of the show's first airing, first appearing in print form in 1963). Robert Stockwell from UCLA and Carolyn Duncan served as word authorities during the ABC version.

Jack Clark, Lee Vines, and John Harlan whispered the password to viewers on the first two versions of the show, but the practice was discontinued, beginning with Password All-Stars, when a computer (referred to as "Murphy" by Ludden) was incorporated. The computer would display the password one letter at a time (like a typewriter), followed by the quotation marks. A beeping sound would accompany each letter as it appeared on the screen. A final beep would signal that the password was revealed to the home viewer, and play would start. On Password Plus, a bell would ring when the password was revealed. On Super Password from September 24, 1984, to October 31, 1986, a chirping sound was heard when the password was revealed. However, Gene Wood began whispering the words on Super Password just like in the original, starting on November 3, 1986. The practice was again discontinued on Million Dollar Password, while the 2022 revival reinstated it.

Before the cancellation of the Goodson-Todman game show Snap Judgment on NBC in 1969, that program's set was changed to make it resemble the look of the CBS Password. Goodson-Todman did this to correspond to rule changes that made Snap Judgment identical to Password.

Contestants
On the CBS daytime version, contestants played two matches, win or lose, with each game awarding $100 to the winner. For most of the CBS nighttime version's first year, the same two players stayed for the entire show, playing as many matches as time allowed. However, after three contestants managed to break the $1,000 mark, this practice was changed in November 1962 to having two new contestants play each game (generally, three pairs of contestants competed in the course of each show), with winning contestants receiving $250 and losers receiving $50.

For two shows in July 1965, the nighttime version experimented with a "championship match" format, in which the winners of games 1 and 2 would return to compete against each other in the final game. Also in 1965, the show adopted an annual "Tournament of Champions" where contestants on the daytime version who won both their games were invited back to compete for more money.

Early on in the ABC version, contestants played a single-elimination game; winning contestants could stay until they were either defeated or won a maximum of 10 games, thus retiring them as undefeated champions. Later on, the limit was dropped, and champions stayed on the show until defeated. From 1973 to 1974, the first contestant to win a two-out-of-three match played the Lightning Round.

Every three months, the four top winners during that period would return for a quarterly contest. The winner would earn $1,000 and the right to compete in the annual Tournament of Champions. The winner of the annual contest won $5,000, received a free trip to Macedonia, and faced the previous year's champion in a best-of-seven match for $10,000. Lewis Retrum, from Boston, won the Tournament of Champions two years in a row and retired undefeated when the show went off the air.

Format changes
From November 18, 1974, to February 21, 1975, Password became Password All-Stars, where teams of celebrities played for charity in a tournament-style format. At the end of each week, the highest scorer would win $5,000 and advance to the Grandmasters' Championship, which would award the winner another $25,000. The first tournament's finalists were Dick Gautier, James Shigeta, Peter Bonerz, and Don Galloway, with Shigeta winning the championship; the second tournament's finalists were Richard Dawson, Bill Bixby, Hal Linden, and Betty White, with Dawson winning the championship (Dawson had almost made it to the first tournament finals, but Gautier beat him out during their preliminary week by just one point).

After the celebrity format modification proved unpopular with viewers, Goodson-Todman made Password All-Stars simply Password again, but the show carried over elements of All-Stars mainly to use the set that had been redesigned for the all-celebrity period. Among these was an elimination round in which four contestants (two new players and the two players from the previous game) competed with the help of the two celebrities in the first round. In the qualifying round, one of the two celebrities used a one-word clue to a password (with both celebrities alternating turns on giving clues), and the four contestants would ring in with the password. If no contestant identified the password after four clues, the word would be discarded. A correct response earned that contestant one point, with three points needed to qualify for the regular game. An incorrect response locked that player out of the word in play. The first two contestants to reach three points went on to play the regular Password game.

In the regular game, an addition to the rules was the "double" option, in which the first clue giver could ask to increase the word value to 20 points by giving only one clue; if that word was missed, the other team could score the 20 points with a second clue. The first team to reach 50 points or more could win thousands of dollars in the Big Money Lightning Round, using a three-step structure in which the winning team attempted to guess three passwords within 30 seconds per step. The contestant was paid as follows:
 Part One: Each password paid $25. Guessing all three passwords in 30 seconds further netted $5 for each second left on the clock. The round ended if the contestant was unable to guess at least one of the three passwords.
 Part Two: The money earned in part one would be multiplied by the number of passwords guessed here. Naming all three passwords this time added $10 for each second left. If the receiver failed to identify at least one of the passwords here, the round ended and the contestant still kept all part-one winnings; he or she then returned to the elimination panel to compete for the right to play the main game again.
 Part Three: Naming all three passwords in 30 seconds multiplied the contestant's part-two winnings tenfold (meaning if a player accumulated $500 after two parts, guessing all three passwords in this part would earn $5,000).

Broadcast history

CBS: 1961–1967

With Goodson–Todman established as a reliable producer of highly rated games for CBS, including What's My Line?, To Tell the Truth, and I've Got a Secret, the network gave the new word-association game the 2:00 PM (1:00 Central) time slot, replacing the courtroom-themed game Face the Facts. As television's first successful celebrity–civilian team game, Password attracted a large and loyal audience that made it into a solid Nielsen favorite for nearly five years while shows came and went with great frequency on the other networks. A concurrent prime-time version, which debuted in January 1962, was also successful, but less than the daytime show. Both versions performed strongly in the ratings.

On July 11, 1966, CBS preempted Password in favor of live coverage of a press conference held by Secretary of Defense Robert McNamara on the progress of the Vietnam War. The other two networks went ahead with their regular schedules because their news divisions had not been granted the power to make programming decisions. A new show beginning that day on ABC, The Newlywed Game, attracted some Password fans. NBC also benefited from the CBS programming decision, experiencing success with the recently launched soap opera Days of Our Lives.

Over the next year, The Newlywed Game and Days of Our Lives got higher ratings than Password. CBS daytime head Fred Silverman cancelled Password in the spring of 1967 after squabbles over where the show would be taped (New York City or Hollywood). Silverman wanted the show permanently moved to CBS Television City, where it was moved for part of the 1966–1967 season for taping in color because CBS's New York studios had not made the full switch to color. Mark Goodson, however, opposed permanently moving the show to Hollywood.

Password was most often taped in New York at CBS-TV Studio 52 (later converted to the Studio 54 discothèque) and CBS-TV Studio 50 (the Ed Sullivan Theater) until the end of the daytime run in 1967. The original CBS version made annual trips to CBS Television City during the 1960s, including once when the CBS New York studios were upgraded for color TV. During its run, Password was taped in all four of the studios at different times (31, 33, 41 and 43).

ABC: 1971–1975

Goodson-Todman sold reruns of the CBS version to local stations via syndication in the late 1960s, and in some markets, they performed quite well in mid-morning or late-afternoon slots. This prompted ABC to contact Mark Goodson about reviving the game; this time around, Goodson agreed to have the show tape in Hollywood per ABC's wishes. Password would become Goodson-Todman's first show to be staged in Los Angeles full-time rather than New York City. The company eventually moved almost all production to southern California during the 1970s. The show was taped at ABC Studio TV-10, "The Vine Street Theater," in Hollywood and the ABC Television Center.

The network slated Password to replace the cult soap Dark Shadows at 4:00 PM (3:00 Central) on April 5, 1971. Some of the more devoted Shadows fans threatened ABC with physical disruption of the first tapings of Password at the Hollywood studios. These plans never materialized and ABC went ahead, managing strong results against NBC's Somerset and reruns of Gomer Pyle, USMC on CBS.

ABC promoted the show to 12:30 PM (11:30 AM Central) on September 6, where it faced stronger challenges in the form of CBS' long-running Search for Tomorrow and NBC's The Who, What, or Where Game, which had been on for two years. Password held up well there for six months until the network moved it up a half-hour to 12:00 PM (11:00 AM Central) on March 20, 1972, for the new Hatos-Hall game Split Second. Password came in a solid second to NBC's Jeopardy! and out-performed three-year-old CBS soap Where the Heart Is. CBS replaced Heart on March 26, 1973, with the youth-oriented The Young and the Restless, causing Password and Jeopardy! to hit ratings trouble that year.

Even though NBC moved Jeopardy! on January 7, 1974 from 12:00 PM to 10:30 AM (9:30 Central) in favor of Jackpot!, the ABC Password was sliding into third place. In May, the show won the first-ever Daytime Emmy Award for Outstanding Game Show. A large Emmy statue then became part of the set's backdrop until the overhaul in November.

Beginning on July 15, 1974, several gimmicks were tried to boost ratings. This included:
 Monty Hall guest-hosting for several weeks; from July 15 to the 26th he did two weeks with Ludden and Elizabeth Montgomery as the celebrities, while the third (September 23–27) was a "Four-Celebrity Charity Week" with Ludden and his wife Betty White competing as a team against celebrities including Richard Dawson, Arlene Francis, Vicki Lawrence, and White's mother Tess.
 Several other celebrity-filled weeks for charity were also held from July 29 to August 2, September 16–20, and October 14–18.
 A week (September 2–6) in which Joyce Bulifant and Joseph Campanella played with their children ("Celebrities and Their Children Week"); this was followed by "Celebrities and Their Wives Week" from September 9 to the 13th and a "Celebrity Husbands & Wives Charity Week" from September 30 to October 4.
 Two weeks containing big winners from throughout the show's run aired from October 21 to November 1; this was followed from November 4 through the 8th by a week in which the show's producers and writers played the game for charity with George Peppard and Linda Kaye Henning.

On November 18 (after one final week of unknown content), the show ran an all-celebrity format called Password All-Stars. Although Goodson-Todman had success with celebrity-driven formats such as Match Game (which debuted in 1973) and Tattletales (which began earlier in the year) through the late 1970s, the lack of civilian contestants and significantly altered rules on Password drove more viewers away.

On February 24, 1975, Goodson-Todman abandoned the all-stars format (but changed the contestant configuration in order to avoid another set redesign) in a last-ditch effort to save the program. Although Password was given another eighteen weeks, ABC had all but given up on the show. Aside from a week in which Betty White hosted while her husband played (March 24–28), no more gimmicks were attempted for the rest of the run.

On June 27, 1975, four members of the show's staff played a "mock game" which filled some time after the final Lightning Round. Mark Goodson then appeared to declare Ludden "Mr. Password" and mentioned that numerous elementary schoolteachers in the U.S. used the various editions of the Milton Bradley-packaged home game as a tool to teach their pupils English. Ludden and White then gave an emotional farewell. Password was replaced with Showoffs, which lasted six months.

Password Plus

In 1978, Goodson-Todman tried again and successfully brought Password to NBC on January 8, 1979, with Allen Ludden returning as host. It was originally announced in Variety magazine as Password '79, in the manner that Match Game named its 1973 version with the year. Celebrity guest Carol Burnett remarked during a run-through that with the various new elements the show had adopted, it was "Password Plus". The name stuck and became the title of the revival. Gene Wood served as the primary announcer (with Johnny Olson and Bob Hilton as substitutes); however, the announcers did not announce the passwords as in previous editions.

Ludden hosted until 1980 when he was forced to step down due to a bout with stomach cancer. Initially, Ludden took a month off from taping to deal with his illness, and Bill Cullen took time off from hosting Chain Reaction to step in for him. (During this time Geoff Edwards stepped in for Cullen on Chain.) Eventually, Ludden's cancer worsened and he left the series after October 24, 1980; he succumbed to the disease in 1981. The producers, reportedly at Ludden's request, hired Tom Kennedy - whose TV credits included the Password-inspired You Don't Say! - to take over Password Plus, and he remained as host until its final episode aired on March 26, 1982.

Super Password
On September 24, 1984, NBC brought the format back as Super Password with Bert Convy hosting; with few tweaks, gameplay remained in the Password Plus format. Rich Jeffries was the first announcer until November 23, 1984, and filled in for the returning Gene Wood sporadically thereafter, as did Bob Hilton. As noted above, the tradition of the announcers reading the passwords was reinstated midway through the show's run.

Super Password ran until March 24, 1989, and was canceled on the same day as another NBC game show, Sale of the Century. In some markets in the Eastern time zone, the show was preempted by local news due to its 12:00 PM time slot. NBC stations in the Central and Pacific time zones usually preempted Scrabble at 11:30 for local news and aired Super Password at 11:00.

Million Dollar Password

CBS picked up a new version of the show entitled Million Dollar Password, hosted by Regis Philbin, which premiered on June 1, 2008, and ran for 12 episodes over two seasons. The series was taped in New York and was the second million-dollar game show that Philbin has hosted (the first being the American network version Who Wants To Be A Millionaire?). The first season was taped at the Kaufman Astoria Studios in New York City, and the second season was taped at the CBS Studio Center in Los Angeles.

Buzzr (YouTube)
From March 4, 2015 until June 18, 2016, the Buzzr YouTube channel had a very short-lived online reboot of Password hosted by online personality Steve Zaragoza (SourceFed) where various internet celebrities were teamed up as contestants instead of a celebrity and civilian being paired up.

NBC: 2022
NBC greenlit a new version of Password from Fremantle with current Tonight Show host Jimmy Fallon as executive producer, on May 17, 2021, during NBCUniversal's upfronts presentation. On January 24, 2022, a casting notice was put out. In April 2022, it was reported that Keke Palmer would serve as host, and that the show would premiere in the summer, later specified as August 9. The first episode was dedicated to Betty White. Each hour-long episode consists of two half-hour matches, each with different pairs of contestants.

Gameplay is reminiscent of the 1961–74 versions, with games played to 15 points and the point value for each password starting at 6 for the first clue. If an illegal clue is given, the opposing team gets two points. Two such games are played, with the celebrities switching partners for the second game; if the contestants each win one game, a tie-breaker round, presented on-screen similarly to the Password Puzzle format from Password Plus and Super Password, is played. Palmer reads a series of up to five clues to the final password; whoever buzzes-in with the correct answer moves on to the bonus round. An incorrect answer, however, allows the opponent a guess with all five clues revealed. If both players answer incorrectly, the procedure repeats until one buzzes-in with correct answer.

The bonus round uses a modified Alphabetics/Super Password round format (again from Plus/Super). The contestant now plays with both celebrities, where they have a total of 60 seconds to guess all ten passwords that begin with consecutive letters of the alphabet. After one celebrity plays for the first 30 seconds, they switch out and gameplay resumes. If an illegal clue is given during the first 30 seconds, a new word beginning with the same letter will be used during the second 30. The contestant wins $1,000 per guessed word, and $25,000 for solving all ten before time runs out. If all ten are not solved in time, the contestant receives one more password for both celebrities to jointly guess. After giving a single clue, the contestant puts on headphones and turns their back to the celebrities, while they deliberate for up to 30 seconds. If they are correct, the contestant's winnings are doubled; if not, they keep their previous winnings. (This final password is the only one not revealed to the home audience beforehand.)

The final episode of the first season featured four celebrities playing for charity and switching teams for the second half of the episode. One member of the winning team gives the clues in the bonus round and the other guesses the password in 60 seconds. If all ten passwords are not solved, the celebrity gives a clue to the other celebrities and puts on headphones during the deliberation. Fallon, instead of playing in the second half of the episode, let Palmer take his place playing, while he hosted.

Episode status
All of the CBS primetime episodes were preserved on videotape, and have aired on GSN and Buzzr. The final year of the CBS daytime version and the second primetime version was preserved on color videotape, as the producers chose to syndicate those reruns following the program's first cancellation. Most of the earlier daytime episodes are presumed lost; at least two daytime episodes are available on home video, each one as part of a general game show compilation package. A number of episodes exist in the UCLA Film and Television Archive.

The ABC version is considered to be almost completely gone. Clips from the December 7, 1971 episode featuring Brett Somers and Jack Klugman were featured on VH1's I Love the '70s: Volume 2 in 2006. GSN aired the complete Somers/Klugman episode on September 11, 2006, in the early morning hours as part of its weekly overnight classic game-show programming (and aired it again in tribute following Somers' death). Buzzr aired the complete Somers/Klugman episode on August 8, 2022.
 
A second studio master from February 14, 1972, with Sheila MacRae and Martin Milner is also known to have survived; the opening of that episode can be seen on YouTube, with the complete episode being uploaded in May 2020. Four episodes from 1975 circulate amongst collectors, two as recorded by home viewers: the Password All-Stars Finale; a studio master of episode #15 of the big-money revamp (March 14, 1975) with Betty White and Vicki Lawrence; a kinescope of episode #24 of the revamp (March 27, 1975); and the June 27, 1975 Finale with Kate Jackson and Sam Melville. An audio recording of an episode featuring Jack Klugman and Loretta Swit from 1975 is also known to have survived. A few more episodes from this run are held in UCLA's film and television archive.

It is believed that the videotapes that were used for the ABC Password were recycled and reused for the Dawson version of Family Feud, which began on July 12, 1976.

Both NBC daytime versions were preserved and have aired in reruns on GSN and Buzzr.

Home media
On December 2, 2008, BCI Entertainment Company LLC (under license from FremantleMedia Enterprises) released a DVD box set "The Best of Password, starring Allen Ludden: The CBS Years - 1962–1967". The set predominately features the nighttime show, with most of the final disc containing daytime episodes from 1967; notably, despite their existence, neither the nighttime nor daytime finales are present. This 3-Disc set contains 30 episodes of Password (1961 daytime episodes and 1962-1967 primetime episodes), uncut and unedited, and also digitally transferred, remastered, and restored from the original B&W kinescopes and original 2-inch color videotapes.

Although Password began in 1961, the DVD set consistently states "The CBS Years: 1962–1967". This misleading title may be due to the earliest episode on the set being the nighttime premiere, which aired in early 1962. A rerelease by Mill Creek, which acquired the rights to the Fremantle game-show DVD sets following BCI's collapse, corrected this error.

An early mock-up of the packaging showed host Ludden on the later CBS set, with the original ABC logo on the front of the desk (as well as on the spine), while a slew of celebrities was listed on the bottom of the cover. Further, the press release stated that the set would range "from the early 1960s all the way up to the mid 1970s", indicating that ABC episodes would be included. A later update to the box art removed the celebrity list and clarified that the set would only cover the CBS era, although the ABC logo was still present (the front cover now had it in place of the CBS logo above Ludden). The ABC logo was omitted altogether when the DVD set was released, with the CBS logo behind Ludden in the original picture being enlarged.

Proposals

1998 version
According to a November 11, 1997 issue of Broadcasting & Cable magazine, it was reported that former talk show host and emcee of the short-lived 1990 NBC daytime revival of To Tell the Truth, Gordon Elliott was being prepped to become the brand new host of a version of Password planned for syndication in the Fall of 1998, with Pearson/All-American Television to have produced the series. However, those plans never materialized.

2016 version
On May 14, 2016, an article from Buzzerblog received word from an anonymous but reputable source that Password was listed as a possible new alternative series on the internal ABC affiliate website. But neither the host, premiere date, nor taping/casting information have been mentioned since.

International versions

Home games

The Milton Bradley Company introduced the first home version of Password in 1962 and subsequently released 24 editions of the game until 1986. Owing to common superstition, these releases were numbered 1–12 and 14–25, skipping 13. It was tied with Concentration as the most prolific of Milton Bradley's home versions of popular game shows and was produced well into the Super Password era of the television show. Milton Bradley also published three editions of a Password Plus home game between 1979 and 1981, but never did a version for Super Password.

Since 1997, Endless Games has released seven editions of Password, including a children's edition (with gameplay closer to the various incarnations of Pyramid), a special "50th Anniversary Edition" in 2011 and a DVD edition featuring the voice of Todd Newton (notably, the latter uses the original ABC logo on its packaging). In addition, Endless released a home version of Million-Dollar Password in 2008.

A computer version of Super Password was released by GameTek for MS-DOS systems, as well as the Apple II and Commodore 64, shortly before the series was canceled. A Nintendo Entertainment System version was also planned but never released. Tiger Electronics released an electronic hand-held "Super Password" game in the late 1990s. More recently, Irwin Toys released a new hand-held electronic version featuring a touch screen with a stylus to enter words.

An online version of Password was once available on its now-defunct website Uproar.com where instead of just one partner every time, you were allowed to play along with lots of other people in a party atmosphere. However, as of September 30, 2006, the website no longer offers any game show-based online games of any kind.

Interactive online versions of Password Plus & Super Password were once available from Game Show Network where you would play along while watching the show.

As with several other Goodson-Todman/Goodson game shows, Password has been adapted into a slot machine by WMS Gaming. A simulated Allen Ludden emcees the proceedings, with the voices and caricatures of Rose Marie, Dawn Wells, Adam West, and Marty Allen. One bonus round offers the player free spins; the other involves choosing from four envelopes offered by the celebrities. Finding the "Password" envelope advances the player to a new level with four more envelopes, worth more prize money.

See also
Subconscious Password, a comedic 2013 3-D animated short inspired by the original Password.

References

External links
  (NBC)
 
 
 
 
 
 "Official" website that created the Password video slot machine (via Internet Archive)

1960s American game shows
1961 American television series debuts
1967 American television series endings
1970s American game shows
1971 American television series debuts
1975 American television series endings
2020s American game shows
2022 American television series debuts
American Broadcasting Company original programming
American television series revived after cancellation
Black-and-white American television shows
CBS original programming
Daytime Emmy Award for Outstanding Game Show winners
Guessing games
NBC original programming
Television series by Fremantle (company)
Television series by Mark Goodson-Bill Todman Productions
Television series by Universal Television
Word games